Nelson Borges da Costa (born 17 October 1992), known as Nelson Borges, is a Portuguese professional footballer who is currently a free agent. He also holds Swiss citizenship.

External links
 Career history at ASF
 

1992 births
Living people
Portuguese footballers
FC Lausanne-Sport players
Portuguese expatriate sportspeople in Switzerland
Association football defenders
Portuguese expatriate footballers
Expatriate footballers in Switzerland